Jay County is a county in the U.S. state of Indiana. As of 2020, the population was 20,478.  The county seat is Portland.

History
The Indiana State Legislature passed an omnibus county bill on 7 February 1835 that authorized the creation of thirteen counties in northeast Indiana, including Jay - the only county in the United States named for John Jay, co-author of The Federalist Papers, Secretary of Foreign Affairs under the Articles of Confederation, and first Chief Justice of the United States. John Jay had died in 1829.

Geography
Jay County lies on the east side of Indiana; its east border abuts the western border of Ohio. Its low, rolling terrain is entirely devoted to agriculture or urban development. Its highest point ( ASL) is a small rise on the east border with Ohio, 2,600 feet north of the county's SE corner. The Salamonie River originates near Salamonia in southeastern Jay County and flows generally northwestwardly into Blackford County (It joins the Wabash River from the south in Wabash County).

Adjacent counties

 Adams County - north
 Mercer County, Ohio - east
 Darke County, Ohio - southeast
 Randolph County - south
 Delaware County - southwest
 Blackford County - west
 Wells County - northwest

Cities & Towns

 Dunkirk
 Bryant
 Pennville
 Portland
 Redkey
 Salamonia

Townships

 Bearcreek
 Greene
 Jackson
 Jefferson
 Knox
 Madison
 Noble
 Penn
 Pike
 Richland
 Wabash
 Wayne

Unincorporated communities

 Antioch
 Antiville
 Balbec
 Bellfountain
 Blaine
 Bloomfield
 Bluff Point
 Boundary City
 Brice
 Center
 College Corner
 Collett
 Como
 Fiat
 Greene
 Jay City
 Kitt
 Liber
 New Corydon
 New Mount Pleasant
 Noble
 Pleasant Ridge
 Poling
 Pony
 Powers
 Ridertown
 Salem
 Trinity
 West Liberty
 Westchester

Major highways
Sources: National Atlas, US Census Bureau

Climate and weather

Government

The county government is a constitutional body, and is granted specific powers by the Constitution of Indiana and by the Indiana Code.

County Council: The county council is the legislative branch of the county government and controls all the spending and revenue collection in the county. Representatives, elected to four-year terms from county districts, are responsible for setting salaries, the annual budget, and special spending. The council has limited authority to impose local taxes, in the form of an income and property tax that is subject to state level approval, excise taxes, and service taxes.

Board of Commissioners: The executive body of the county; commissioners are elected county-wide to staggered four-year terms. One commissioner serves as president. The commissioners execute the acts legislated by the council, collecting revenue, and managing the day-to-day functions of the county government.

Court: The county maintains circuit and superior courts with the latter having a small claims division. Both courts have general jurisdiction with the circuit court having exclusive jurisdiction of juvenile and probate matters. The court's judges are elected to six-year terms, and must be admitted to practice law before the state supreme court. In some cases, court decisions can be appealed to the state level circuit court.

County Officials: The county has other elected offices, including prosecuting attorney, assessor, sheriff, coroner, auditor, treasurer, recorder, surveyor, and circuit court clerk Each officer is elected to four-year terms. Members elected to county government positions are required to declare party affiliations and to be residents of the county.

Jay County is part of Indiana's 3rd congressional district; Indiana Senate district 19; and Indiana House of Representatives district 33.

Demographics

As of the 2010 United States Census, there were 21,253 people, 8,133 households, and 5,647 families in the county. The racial makeup of the county was 97.0% white, 0.4% Asian, 0.3% black or African American, 0.1% American Indian, 1.3% from other races, and 0.9% from two or more races. Those of Hispanic or Latino origin made up 2.7% of the population. In terms of ancestry, 34.1% were German, 13.1% were American, 11.7% were English, and 11.6% were Irish.

Of the 8,133 households, 32.8% had children under the age of 18 living with them, 53.6% were married couples living together, 10.4% had a female householder with no husband present, 30.6% were non-families, and 25.6% of all households were made up of individuals. The average household size was 2.58 and the average family size was 3.10. The median age was 39.0 years.

The median income for a household in the county was $47,697 and the median income for a family was $47,926. Males had a median income of $38,142 versus $26,928 for females. The per capita income for the county was $18,946. About 10.0% of families and 13.5% of the population were below the poverty line, including 22.7% of those under age 18 and 7.8% of those age 65 or over.

Literary reference
Jens looked at a map he'd filched from an abandoned gas station. If he was where he thought he was, he'd soon be approaching the grand metropolis of Fiat, by God, Indiana. He managed a smile when he saw that, and declaimed, "And God said, Fiat, Indiana, and there was Indiana."

--Harry Turtledove, Worldwar: In the Balance, New York: Random House (1994), Chapter 14, copyright 1994 by Harry Turtledove. The reference is to the unincorporated town of Fiat near the intersection of Indiana State Routes 1 and 18 in Jay County.

See also
 National Register of Historic Places listings in Jay County, Indiana

Further reading
 Montgomery, M.W. History Of Jay County, Indiana (1864). Whitefish: Kessinger Publishing (2010).

References

External links

 Jay County, Indiana 

 
Indiana counties
1836 establishments in Indiana
Populated places established in 1836